Micah 4 is the fourth chapter of the Book of Micah in the Hebrew Bible or the Old Testament of the Christian Bible. This book contains the prophecies attributed to the prophet Micah, and is a part of the Book of the Twelve Minor Prophets.

Text
The original text was written in the Hebrew language. This chapter is divided into 13 verses in English Bibles, but 14 verses in Hebrew Bible (Masoretic Text) using a different verse numbering (see below).

Verse numbering
There are some differences in verse numbering of this chapter in English Bibles and Hebrew texts:

This article generally follows the common numbering in Christian English Bible versions, with notes to the numbering in Hebrew Bible versions.

Textual versions
Some early manuscripts containing the text of this chapter in Hebrew are of the Masoretic Text tradition, which includes the Codex Cairensis (895), the Petersburg Codex of the Prophets (916), Codex Leningradensis (1008). Fragments cumulatively containing all verses of this chapter in Hebrew were found among the Dead Sea Scrolls, including 4Q82 (4QXIIg; 25 BCE) with extant verses 1–2; and Wadi Murabba'at Minor Prophets (Mur88; MurXIIProph; 75-100 CE) with extant verses 1–13.

There is also a translation into Koine Greek known as the Septuagint, made in the last few centuries BCE. Extant ancient manuscripts of the Septuagint version include Codex Vaticanus (B; B; 4th century), Codex Alexandrinus (A; A; 5th century) and Codex Marchalianus (Q; Q; 6th century). Some fragments containing parts of this chapter (a revision of the Septuagint) were found among the Dead Sea Scrolls, that is, Naḥal Ḥever (8ḤevXIIgr; late 1st century BCE) with extant verses 3–10.

Peace at the last (4:1–5)
This section begins with a vision of universal peace, with several verbal associations to the last part of chapter 3. The peace (verses 3b–4) is linked to the willingness of the nations to submit to God's order, as urged in verse 5.

Verse 3
And he shall judge among many people, and rebuke strong nations afar off; and they shall beat their swords into plowshares, and their spears into pruninghooks: nation shall not lift up a sword against nation, neither shall they learn war any more.
Cross reference: Isaiah 2:4
"Plowshare": a part of a large plow, that is, 'the metal tip which actually breaks the earth and cuts the furrow'.

Verse 4
 But everyone shall sit under his vine and under his fig tree,
 And no one shall make them afraid;
 For the mouth of the Lord of hosts has spoken.
This verse does not have parallel in the corresponding passage in the Book of Isaiah, so it is considered an original part of the oracle to Micah, although it still has 'Isaianic characteristics', pointing to the existence of 'a common original which was developed in Isaianic circles'.

A positive role for the remnant (4:6–7)
The realization of the vision (cf. 'in that day') will begin by God's rule in Zion over the restored remnant. As 4:1–5 reverses 3:9–12, so here the judgement of 2:12–13 is overturned (see too Zephaniah 3:11–20). This absolute use of the word 'remnant' is post-exilic, and helps to locate the setting of the redaction of this section as a whole.

Verse 7
 And I will make her that halted a remnant, and her that was cast far off a strong nation: and the Lord shall reign over them in mount Zion from henceforth, even for ever.

The instrument of God's rule (4:8–5:6)
This section has a balanced structure, with verses 4:8 and 5:2 (introducing 5:2–6) exactly parallel, and three short paragraphs in between, each of which is introduced by the word 'now' (4:9, 11; 5:1).

Verse 8
 And thou, O tower of the flock,
 the strong hold of the daughter of Zion,
 unto thee shall it come, even the first dominion;
 the kingdom shall come to the daughter of Jerusalem.
 "And thou, O tower of the flock": "Tower of Ader, Migdal Eder" which is interpreted 'tower of the flock,' about 1000 paces (a mile) from Bethlehem," according to Jerome who lived there, "and foresignifying (in its very name) by a sort of prophecy the shepherds at the Birth of the Lord." Jacob fed his sheep near there , and later (due to its proximity to Bethlehem) the shepherds who watched over their flocks by night, saw and heard the angels proclaiming "Glory to God in the highest, and on earth peace, good will toward men." Jewish literature inferred that the Messiah should be revealed in this place, that is, the place where Messiah as "the lamb of God" should be born.
 "The stronghold (ophel, "the hill") of the daughter of Zion": The name "Ophel" is given to the southern spur of Mount Moriah, opposite to the Mount Zion, separated by the Tyropoeon Valley. It was fortified by Jotham and Manasseh. The king's house (the old palace of David) and "the tower that lieth out," or the upper tower (see ) were built on this land. It could be the same as "flock tower" (compare , where Ophel and the watch tower are named together) because it was originally a place of refuge for flocks, or of observation for shepherds. Other than representing the power and dominion of Jerusalem, the term also recalls David's work was a shepherd before he was king, and that 'the Israelites are the sheep of the Lord's pasture'. The Septuagint adds , alluding to the siege of Jerusalem by the Chaldeans.
 "Even the first dominion; the kingdom shall come to the daughter of Jerusalem": or rather, "and the first dominion shall come, the kingdom to the daughter of Jerusalem": meaning, not the first notice of the Messiah's kingdom, given by John the Baptist, Christ, and his apostles, to the Jews, in the first times of the Gospel; or the preaching of the Gospel of the kingdom first to them; but rather he who has the first or principal dominion, and to whom the kingdom belongs, he shall come to the daughter of Zion, as in Zechariah 9:9; though it rather respects here his coming to them at the time of their conversion, when they shall come to him, ; and when the first, chief, and principal kingdom in the world, and which is preferable to all others, will come unto, and be placed among them, as in Micah 4:7; and when it shall be, as some interpret it, as at the beginning, in the days of David and Solomon, and much more abundantly.
 "Kingdom shall come to the daughter of Jerusalem": rather, "the kingdom of the daughter of Jerusalem shall come (again)"; such as it was under David, before its being weakened by the secession of the ten tribes.

See also

Related Bible parts: Genesis 35, Isaiah 2, Micah 5, Luke 2, Revelation 20

Notes

References

Sources

External links

Jewish
Micah 4 Hebrew with Parallel English
Micah 4 Hebrew with Rashi's Commentary

Christian
Micah 4 English Translation with Parallel Latin Vulgate

04